Eric Revis (born May 31, 1967) is a jazz bassist and composer. Revis came to prominence as a bassist with singer Betty Carter in the mid-1990s. Since 1997 he has been a member of Branford Marsalis's ensemble. His debut album, Tales of the Stuttering Mime, was released in 2004 on his own 11:11 Records.

Revis studied under Ellis Marsalis at the University of New Orleans and at St. Mary's University, Texas. He directed the Jazz Ensemble at Trinity University in San Antonio, Texas in 2007 and 2008.

Discography

As leader
 Tales of the Stuttering Mime (11:11, 2004)
 Laughter's Necklace of Tears (11:11, 2009)
 Parallax (Clean Feed, 2012)
 City of Asylum (Clean Feed, 2013)
 In Memory of Things Yet Seen (Clean Feed, 2014)
 Crowded Solitudes (Clean Feed, 2016)
 Sing Me Some Cry (Clean Feed, 2017)
 Slipknots Through a Looking Glass (Pyroclastic, 2020)

With Tarbaby
 Tarbaby (Imani 2009)
 The End of Fear (Posi-Tone 2010)
 Fanon (RogueArt, 2013)
 Ballad of Sam Langford (Hipnotic, 2013)

As sideman
With J. D. Allen
 In Search of (Red Record, 1999)
 Pharoah's Children (Criss Cross, 2001)
 I Am I Am (Sunnyside, 2008)

With Orrin Evans
 Blessed Ones (Criss Cross, 2001)
 Meant to Shine (Palmetto, 2002)
 Easy Now (Criss Cross, 2005)
 ...It Was Beauty (Criss Cross, 2013)
 The Intangible Between (Smoke Sessions, 2020)

With Avram Fefer
 Calling All Spirits (Cadence, 2001)
 Ritual (Clean Feed, 2009)
 Eliyahu (Not Two, 2011)
 Testament (Clean Feed, 2019)

With Russell Gunn
 Gunn Fu (HighNote, 1997)
 Young Gunn Plus (32 Jazz, 1998)
 Love Requiem (HighNote, 1999)
 SmokinGunn (HighNote, 2000)
 Blue On the D.L. (HighNote, 2002)

With Branford Marsalis
 Music Evolution (Columbia, 1997)
 Requiem (Columbia, 1999)
 Contemporary Jazz (Columbia, 2000)
 Footsteps of Our Fathers (Marsalis Music/Rounder, 2002)
 Romare Bearden Revealed (Marsalis Music/Rounder, 2003)
 Performs Coltrane's Love Supreme Live in Amsterdam (Marsalis Music/Rounder, 2004)
 Eternal (Rounder 2004)
 Braggtown (Marsalis Music/Rounder, 2006)
 Classic (Sony, 2008)
 American Spectrum (BIS, 2009)
 Metamorphosen (Marsalis Music, 2009)
 Four MFs Playin' Tunes (Marsalis Music, 2012)
 Upward Spiral (Marsalis Music, 2016)
 The Secret Between the Shadow and the Soul (Marsalis Music, 2019)

With Armen Nalbandian
 Quiet as It's Kept (Blacksmith Brother, 2011)
 Fire Sign (Blacksmith Brother, 2018)
 Orbits (Blacksmith Brother, 2018)
 Live in Little Tokyo (Blacksmith Brother, 2018)
 V (Blacksmith Brother, 2018)
 The Holy Ghost (Blacksmith Brother, 2018)
 Live on Sunset (Blacksmith Brother, 2019)
 Ghosts (Blacksmith Brother, 2019)

With Ralph Peterson Jr.
 The Art of War (Criss Cross, 2001)
 Subliminal Seduction (Criss Cross, 2002)
 Tests of Time (Criss Cross, 2003)

With others
 Avishai Cohen, Into the Silence (ECM, 2016)
 Steve Coleman, Weaving Symbolics (Label Bleu, 2006)
 Kat Edmonson, Take to the Sky (Convivium, 2009)
 Winard Harper, Trap Dancer (Savant, 1998)
 Winard Harper, Winard (Savant, 1999)
 Sherman Irby, Full Circle (Blue Note, 1997)
 James Hurt, Dark Grooves, Mystical Rhythms (Blue Note 1999)
 David Kikoski, Mostly Standards (Criss Cross, 2009)
 Victor Lewis, Red Stars (Red Record, 2004)
 Michael Marcus, The Magic Door (Not Two, 2007)
 Delfeayo Marsalis, Minions Domain (Troubadour Jass, 2006)
 Frank McComb, Love Stories (Columbia, 2000)
 Bill McHenry, La Peur Du Vide (Sunnyside, 2012)
 Bill McHenry, Ben Entrada La Nit (Fresh Sound, 2018)
 Raul Midon, State of Mind (Manhattan, 2005)
 Kurt Rosenwinkel, Reflections (Wommusic, 2009)
 Kurt Rosenwinkel, Star of Jupiter (Wommusic, 2012)
 J. D. Walter, One Step Away (JWALREC, 2013)
 Jeff "Tain" Watts, Detained at the Blue Note (Half Note, 2004)

DVD
2004 - Coltrane's A Love Supreme Live in Amsterdam (Branford Marsalis Quartet)

References

External links
 
 

1967 births
Living people
American jazz double-bassists
Male double-bassists
St. Mary's University, Texas alumni
21st-century double-bassists
21st-century American male musicians
American male jazz musicians
Branford Marsalis Quartet members
Buckshot LeFonque members
Clean Feed Records artists
Posi-Tone Records artists
RogueArt artists